Young Oak Kim (born October 18, 1962) is an American politician and businesswoman serving as the U.S. representative for California's 40th congressional district, previously representing the 39th congressional district from 2021 to 2023 . Her district includes northern parts of Orange County. In the 2020 United States House of Representatives elections, Kim, Michelle Park Steel, and Marilyn Strickland became the first three Korean-American women elected to the United States Congress. Kim and Steel are also the first Korean-Americans elected to Congress from California since Jay Kim.

A member of the Republican Party, Young Kim served as the California State Assemblywoman for the 65th district from 2014 to 2016, defeating the incumbent Democrat Sharon Quirk-Silva in 2014. Kim lost the seat in a rematch with Quirk-Silva in 2016. Kim was the first South Korean-born Republican woman elected to the California State Legislature.

In 2018, Kim was the Republican nominee in California's 39th congressional district, narrowly losing to Democrat Gil Cisneros in the general election. In 2020, Kim defeated Cisneros in a rematch. Along with Steel and David Valadao, Kim was among the first three Republican candidates to unseat an incumbent House Democrat in California since 1994.

Early life and education 
Kim was born in 1962 in Incheon, South Korea, and spent her childhood in Seoul. She and her family left South Korea in 1975, living first in Guam, where she finished junior high school, and then Hawaii, where she attended high school. She has a bachelor's degree in business administration from the University of Southern California.

Career

Private sector
After graduating from USC, Kim worked as a financial analyst for First Interstate Bank and then as a controller for JK Sportswear Manufacturing. She also started her own business in the clothing industry.

Kim worked for state senator Ed Royce after her husband met Royce while promoting a nonprofit organization, the Korean American Coalition. After Royce was elected to the U.S. House of Representatives, Kim worked for 21 years as his community liaison and director of Asian affairs. During much of that time she also appeared regularly on her own television show, "LA Seoul with Young Kim", and her radio show, "Radio Seoul", on which she discussed political issues affecting Korean Americans.

California State Assembly

Kim was elected to the Assembly in 2014, defeating Democratic Assemblymember Sharon Quirk-Silva. In 2016, Quirk-Silva defeated Kim.

U.S. House of Representatives

Elections

2018 

In 2017, Kim announced her candidacy for the Orange County Board of Supervisors, a nonpartisan office, in the 4th district, which includes Fullerton, Placentia, La Habra, and Brea, plus portions of Anaheim and Buena Park. In January 2018, immediately after Royce announced his retirement, Kim announced that she would instead enter the race to succeed Royce as the representative for California's 39th congressional district. Royce endorsed Kim the day after announcing his retirement. Kim received the most votes in the primary election among a field of 17 candidates, allowing her to advance to the general election along with the Democratic candidate Gil Cisneros.

Polls showed a tight race throughout the campaign, and FiveThirtyEight called the race a toss-up. Early results on the night of the election showed Kim with a 52.5%-47.5% lead, but she ultimately lost to Cisneros, who received 51.6% of the vote to Kim's 48.4% after mail-in ballots were counted. As the ongoing ballot count showed Kim losing the race, she made allegations of voter fraud but provided no evidence. She conceded on November 18.

2020 

In April 2019, Kim announced that she would run again to represent the 39th district. Immediately after her announcement, top party officials rallied behind her, including House Minority Leader Kevin McCarthy. In the March 2020 jungle primary, Kim received 48.3% of the vote to Cisneros's 46.9%, and thus both advanced out of the primary to a rematch.

Kim proved to be one of the top House fund-raising challengers across the nation, outraising Cisneros $6.16 million to $4.36 million. Unlike in the previous cycle, most election observers rated the race "Lean Democrat", with FiveThirtyEight predicting Kim had a 26% chance of winning.

At the end of election night, Kim led by about 1,000 votes. As mail-in ballots were counted, her lead continued to grow, in contrast to the trend in the previous election. The Associated Press projected her as the winner on November 13. She won even as Democratic presidential nominee Joe Biden carried the district by 10 points. Kim, Michelle Steel and Marilyn Strickland became the first Korean-American women elected to Congress.

2022 

In December 2021, Kim announced that she would seek reelection in California's 40th congressional district, due to redistricting.

Tenure 
On January 3, 2021, Kim was sworn in to the 117th United States Congress.

On January 6, 2021, Kim voted to certify Joe Biden's Electoral College victory, declining to support Republican-led efforts to contest the results.

On January 13, 2021, Kim voted against the second impeachment of Donald Trump. She said she supported censuring Trump but not impeaching him.

On February 4, 2021, Kim joined 10 other Republican House members voting with all voting Democrats to strip Marjorie Taylor Greene of her Education and Labor Committee and Budget Committee assignments in response to controversial political statements she had made.

On February 25, 2021, Kim voted against the Equality Act, a bill that would prohibit discrimination based on gender identity and sexual orientation by amending the Civil Rights Act of 1964 and the Fair Housing Act to explicitly include new protections. In a subsequent statement, Kim stated that she believed that all people should be treated with respect and given equal opportunities, but justified her vote on the grounds that the bill "undermines Americans’ religious freedoms, limits protections for people of faith and opens the door to ending the decades-long bipartisan Hyde Amendment."

On February 27, 2021, Kim joined all Republicans to vote against the American Rescue Plan Act of 2021, a $1.9 trillion COVID-19 relief bill, citing lack of bipartisanship and criticizing the bill for only having 9% of the funding directly going toward combating COVID-19, with most of the aid not spent until 2022.

Kim is rated among the most centrist of Republican representatives by Govtrack, based on patterns of sponsorship and co-sponsorship of legislation with Democrats. She voted opposite to the majority of the Republican caucus on several key votes, among them the reauthorization of the Violence Against Women Act and a bill to delay spending cuts in Medicare and other services. Kim voted with the majority of the Republican caucus 96% of the time.

As of January 2023, Kim had voted in line with President Joe Biden's stated position 31.0% of the time.

Committee assignments 

 Committee on Financial Services
Subcommittee on Financial Institutions and Monetary Policy
 Committee on Foreign Affairs
 Subcommittee on the Indo-Pacific Chair
 Subcommittee on Africa

Previous Committee assignments 
117th United States Congress
 Committee on Foreign Affairs
Subcommittee on Asia, the Pacific, Central Asia and Nonproliferation
Subcommittee on Africa, Global Health and Global Human Rights
 Committee on Small Business
Subcommittee on Innovation, Entrepreneurship, and Workforce Development, Ranking Member
Subcommittee on Economic Growth, Tax and Capital Access
 Committee on Science, Space and Technology
Subcommittee on Space and Aeronautics

Caucus memberships 

Problem Solvers Caucus
Congressional Caucus on Armenian Issues
Congressional Taiwan Caucus
Congressional Caucus on India and Indian-Americans
Republican Main Street Partnership
 Republican Governance Group

Political positions

Kim's congressional platform included opposition to the Affordable Care Act, support for Deferred Action for Childhood Arrivals recipients, support for "the anti-sanctuary city stance taken by the County Board of Supervisors" and support for chain migration. NBC News reported that the issues important to Kim included "creating jobs and keeping taxes low", "beef[ing] up education funding in science, technology, engineering and math", and reforming the immigration system to "ensure those brought to the U.S. 'as children without legal documentation are treated fairly and with compassion.'" She supports student loan forgiveness if the borrower is on the verge of bankruptcy. Kim favors reduced regulations and increased trade. She is a fiscal conservative.

Crime
In June 2020, after the rising calls to "defund the police" in the aftermath of George Floyd's murder, Kim called these demands "irresponsible" and said that defunding law enforcement would make communities more vulnerable. She called for increased accountability and transparency in law enforcement, as well as an increase in training and reevaluation of guidelines to decrease the use of unnecessary force. Kim also argued that the first steps in making progress would require "treating each other with respect regardless of our race or occupation and having honest conversations without accusations or judgement."

Donald Trump

In June 2020, Kim criticized President Trump for referring to COVID-19 as "Kung Flu", and received backlash from some in her party.

Foreign affairs

Korea
Kim has expressed her concerns on the issue of divided families on the Korean Peninsula, especially Korean Americans with relatives in North Korea. In February 2021, she and Grace Meng co-sponsored H.R.826, which would require the Secretary of State and the U.S. Special Envoy on North Korea Human Rights to prioritize helping reunite divided Korean American families.

Kim also worked on the comfort woman issue from the days of Korea under Japanese rule and has said that victims of human trafficking and slavery should be supported. While a California assemblywoman, she attended a protest against Japan's war crimes during WWII at Pershing Square, Los Angeles during Japanese Prime Minister Shinzo Abe's 2015 visit to the U.S. During that gathering, she spoke about comfort women and demanded that the Japanese government issue an apology. In February 2021, she criticized Harvard Law School professor John Mark Ramseyer's claims that those women were "willing sex workers" and urged him to apologize.

LGBT rights 
In 2014, Kim opposed a California law "requiring schools to allow transgender students to use bathrooms of their choice and participate in sports by their gender identity rather than their anatomical gender." During an Orange County Register interview, she said she opposed the law out of concern that new school facilities could need to be constructed, additional spending could be required, students could change their identity "on a whim", and that male-to-female transgender students would have an unfair advantage in sports. She has said transgender people "deserve to be respected" but that she does not believe that LGBT individuals were born with their identities or orientations.

Kim opposed same-sex marriage in 2018. In 2015, she and 61 other Assembly members coauthored a resolution establishing June as Pride Month and recognizing same-sex marriage. When asked about this, Kim said it was to "recognize individuals that are making contributions to our community, [including] the LGBTQ community."

In 2022, Kim opposed the Respect for Marriage Act, which recognizes the validity of same-sex marriages. The law overturned the Defense of Marriage Act. She voted against the several versions of the bill that came before the House.

Taxes
In 2016, Kim's Assembly reelection platform included opposing changes to Proposition 13, which limits property taxes.

Personal life

Kim is married to Charles Kim, a nonprofit administrator and philanthropist. They live in La Habra, California, and previously lived in Fullerton during her 2018 campaign. They have four children. Kim is a Christian.

Electoral history

2014 California State Assembly election

2016 California State Assembly election

2018 California's 39th congressional district election

2020 California's 39th congressional district election

See also 
List of Asian Americans and Pacific Islands Americans in the United States Congress
Asian Americans in politics
Women in the United States House of Representatives
 History of Korean Americans in Los Angeles

Notes

References

External links 

Representative Young Kim official U.S. House website
Young Kim for Congress campaign website

Join California Young Kim

|-

|-

|-

1962 births
21st-century American politicians
21st-century American women politicians
American Protestants
American women of Korean descent in politics
California politicians of Korean descent
Candidates in the 2018 United States elections
Candidates in the 2020 United States elections
Female members of the United States House of Representatives
Living people
Republican Party members of the California State Assembly
Asian-American members of the United States House of Representatives
People from Fullerton, California
People from Incheon
Protestants from California
Republican Party members of the United States House of Representatives from California
South Korean emigrants to the United States
Women state legislators in California
Christians from California
University of Southern California alumni
Politicians from Greater Los Angeles
Asian conservatism in the United States